Snow Creek is a tributary of Mahantango Creek in Northumberland County, Pennsylvania, in the United States. The creek has no named tributaries and is not designated as an impaired waterbody in any stream segment.

Course
Snow Creek begins on a hill in Upper Mahanoy Township. It flows south-southwest for a few tenths of a mile before turning south for a few tenths of a mile, passing through a small pond, reaching the bottom of the hill, and receiving an unnamed tributary from the left. The creek then turns west-southwest for a few tenths of a mile before receiving an unnamed tributary from the right and entering a valley. In the valley, it continues to flow west-southwest for more than a mile before entering Jordan Township. Upon entering this township, the creek gradually turns south for a few tenths of a mile, receiving one unnamed tributary from the right and one from the left. It then turns south-southwest for several tenths of a mile, receiving one unnamed tributary from the right and another from the left before turning southwest and crossing Klingerstown Road. A short distance further downstream, the creek receives another unnamed tributary from the right and reaches its confluence with Mahantango Creek on the border between Northumberland County and Schuylkill County.

Hydrology, geography and geology

As of 2004, no reach of Snow Creek or any of its unnamed tributaries are designated as impaired waterbodies.

Watershed
The creek is entirely within the United States Geological Survey quadrangle of Klingerstown. Its mouth is located within  of Klingerstown.

History
Snow Creek was entered into the Geographic Names Information System on August 2, 1979. Its identifier in the Geographic Names Information System is 1187945.

See also
Deep Creek (Mahantango Creek), next tributary of Mahantango Creek going downstream
Pine Creek (Mahantango Creek), next tributary of Mahantango Creek going upstream
List of rivers of Pennsylvania

References

Rivers of Northumberland County, Pennsylvania
Tributaries of Mahantango Creek
Rivers of Pennsylvania